Jeffrey Stephen Wigand (born December 17, 1942) is an American biochemist and whistleblower.

He is a former vice president of research and development at Brown & Williamson in Louisville, Kentucky, who worked on the development of reduced-harm cigarettes and in 1996 blew the whistle on tobacco tampering at the company. This was adapted for 1999 film The Insider, with Russell Crowe portraying Wigand.

He currently lectures around the world as an expert witness and consultant for various tobacco issues.

Early life, military service and education
Wigand was born in New York City and grew up in the Bronx and later Pleasant Valley, New York. After a brief time in the military (including a short assignment in Vietnam), he earned a Master's in Biochemistry and a PhD from the University at Buffalo in Biochemistry.

Career
Prior to working for Brown & Williamson, Wigand worked for several health care companies, including Pfizer and Johnson & Johnson. In addition, he was employed as General Manager and Marketing Director at Union Carbide in Japan, and as a senior vice president at Technicon Instruments.

Tobacco industry whistleblowing 
Wigand became nationally known as a whistleblower on February 4, 1996, when he appeared on the CBS news program 60 Minutes. He stated that Brown & Williamson had intentionally manipulated its tobacco blend with chemicals such as ammonia to increase the effect of nicotine in cigarette smoke. According to Wigand, he was subsequently harassed and received anonymous death threats. 

Wigand had begun to work for Brown & Williamson in January 1989. He was fired on March 24, 1993. He says that he was fired as a whistleblower because he knew that high-ranking corporate executives knowingly approved the addition of additives to their cigarettes, that were known to be carcinogenic and/or addictive, such as coumarin. 

Brown & Williamson undertook a concerted effort to discredit Wigand, which included hiring the Investigative Group International to produce a 500-page dossier on Wigand, which was distributed to the media. The dossier backfired, as news outlets examined the claims in it, finding many claims of misconduct to be unsubstantiated or trivial.

Post-whistleblowing career 
Following this he taught physical science, biology, and Japanese at duPont Manual Magnet High School in Louisville, Kentucky, and was eventually named 1996 Teacher of the Year for the state of Kentucky.

Wigand no longer teaches high school and instead lectures worldwide to a variety of audiences including children, college, medical and law students and a diverse group of policy makers. He has consulted with governments throughout the world on tobacco control policies.

Media depictions
He was portrayed by Russell Crowe in the 1999 film The Insider directed by Michael Mann, which also stars Al Pacino and Christopher Plummer. Crowe earned an Academy Award nomination for his portrayal of Wigand.

Personal life
He met his first wife, Linda, in 1970 while attending a judo class.

Wigand is married to Hope Elizabeth May, an American philosopher, author and lawyer who is a professor at Central Michigan University in Mount Pleasant, Michigan, where he now resides.

References

External links
 From Knowledge to Action: An Interview With Dr. Jeffrey Wigand January 12, 2010
 An Interview with Dr. Jeffrey Wigand: Part 2 January 19, 2010
 Newslaundry Interviews - Dr Jeffrey Wigand

American biochemists
American whistleblowers
American tobacco industry executives
University at Buffalo alumni
Businesspeople from Louisville, Kentucky
American high school teachers
Science teachers
People from Pleasant Valley, New York
People from the Bronx
1942 births
Living people
Brown & Williamson
Scientists from New York (state)
Japanese-language education in the United States